Tapinoma ramulorum is a species of ant in the genus Tapinoma. Described by Emery in 1896, the species is endemic to Costa Rica and Trinidad and Tobago.

References

Tapinoma
Hymenoptera of North America
Insects described in 1896